The Bega Canal or Begej Canal is a navigation canal of Romania and Serbia. It is the first navigation canal built on the present-day territory of Romania, and serves the city of Timișoara. Its name comes from the Bega river. It crosses the territory of Timiș County in western Romania and proceeds into the territory of Serbia, merging with Begej river near the village of Klek.

History
During the 18th-19th centuries it was the main means of transporting goods in the area as it connected the town to the European capitals: Budapest and Vienna. Nowadays it is used for amusement and sports.

Gallery

External links

Buildings and structures in Timișoara
Canals in Romania
Canals in Serbia
Geography of Vojvodina
Canals opened in 1754
1754 establishments in the Habsburg monarchy
CBega Canal